{{Taxobox
| name = Cytospora sacculus
| regnum = Fungi
| phylum = Ascomycota
| classis = Sordariomycetes
| subclassis = Sordariomycetidae
| ordo = Diaporthales
| familia = Valsaceae
| genus = Cytospora| species = C. sacculus| binomial = Cytospora sacculus
| binomial_authority = (Schwein.) Gvrit. (1969)
}}Cytospora sacculus''''' is a plant pathogen.

References

External links 
 Index Fungorum
 USDA ARS Fungal Database

Diaporthales
Fungal plant pathogens and diseases